Stageworks Media, LLC. is a New York City-based theatrical production company that specializes in partnering with content owners to adapt their library as well as original material for the stage. Stageworks is the producing arm and partner of Playscripts, Inc. Stageworks has partnered with leading companies in the industry, such as CBS, Universal Music Group, and ICM Partners, among others.

References

External links
Official website

2013 establishments in New York City
Mass media companies based in New York City